The 1973 Boise State Broncos football team represented Boise State College during the 1973 NCAA Division II football season, the sixth season of Bronco football (at the four-year level) and the first in the newly reorganized Division II. The Broncos were in their fourth year as members of the Big Sky Conference (and NCAA) and played their home games on campus at Bronco Stadium in Boise, Idaho.

Invited to the inaugural eight-team Division II playoffs, BSC hosted a 53–10 quarterfinal win over  In the semifinals, the Broncos lost 38–34 to Louisiana Tech in the Pioneer Bowl in Texas, giving up a touchdown in the

Schedule

Roster

NFL Draft
Three Broncos were selected in the 1974 NFL Draft, which lasted seventeen rounds (442 selections).

References

External links
 Bronco Football Stats – 1973

Boise State
Boise State Broncos football seasons
Big Sky Conference football champion seasons
Boise State Broncos football